Jean Robiquet (6 July 1874 – 26 March 1960) was a French art historian, art critic and curator. He was also a playwright and opérettes librettist known under the pseudonym Jean Roby.

Biography 
Attached to the Musée Carnavalet in 1897, he became assistant curator in 1904, then chief curator from 1919 to his retirement in 1934. He was also responsible for organizing numerous exhibitions in Sceaux, Bagatelle, in the Orangerie as well as in Carnavalet. In addition to his publications, he contributed to several magazines and newspapers.

He was made an officer of the Legion of Honour.

Publications

Prefaces 
1923: Une tournée dans le vieux Paris, in Paris renseignements pratiques à l'usage de ses visiteurs, Paris syndicat d'initiatives
1928: François Boucher, Les boiseries du musée Carnavalet, Paris, Frazier-Soye
1929: Prosper Dorbec, L'Histoire de Paris au musée Carnavalet, Paris, Rieder
1930: Le théâtre à Paris au XVIIIe siècle [lectures at the musée Carnavalet 1n 1929], with 16 illustrations inset, Paris, Payot
1931: Marguerite Charageat, Chefs-d'œuvre des musées de province, [1e exposition, École française XVIIe et XVIIe siècles, peintures et dessins des musées d'Amiens, Caen, Dijon, Laon…] , musée national de l'Orangerie, Éditions des Musées, 80 p.
1933: Marguerite Charageat, Chefs-d'œuvre des musées de province, [2e exposition, École française XVIIe et XVIIe siècles, peintures et dessins des musées d'Amiens, Angers, Auxerre, Besançon…], musée national de l'Orangerie, Éditions des Musées, 81 p.
1935: Les chefs-d'œuvre du Musée de Grenoble, [exposition au Petit Palais à Paris]
1938: Trouville, Deauville, cités voisines, [pages d'histoire locale], Trouville-sur-Mer, librairie Foucault

Collaborations 
 Jean Robiquet (dir.), « la Parisienne par l'image : trois siècles de grâces féminines », in Le Panorama, Paris, Éd. L. Baschet, 1895
 Musée rétrospective des classes 85 & 86 : le costume et ses accessoires à l'exposition universelle internationale de 1900, à Paris, notices-rapports de Georges Cain, Henri Caïn, Jules Claretie, Lucien Duchet, François Flameng, Henri Lavedan, Maurice Leloir, Jean Robiquet. Imprimerie Belin frères, 1900. Reprint: Paris Conservatoire national des arts et métiers, 2014.
 La collection Dutuit au Petit-Palais des Champs-Élysées, with Georges Cain, Gaston Migeon, Édouard Rahir, Arsène Alexandre, 1 vol, Éditions Goupil, Paris, 1903, 37 p.
 L'œuvre inédit de Gavarni, with Léon Marotte, Paris, H. Floury, 1912
 , La Révolution de 1789. Des origines au 30 septembre 1791, after Michelet, Thiers, Mignet, iconographie de l'époque réunie sous la direction de Jean Robiquet, Paris, Éd. nationales, 1934
 Philippe Sagnac, La Révolution de 1789. Du 30 septembre 1791 au 26 octobre 1795, after Michelet, Thiers, Mignet, iconographie de l'époque réunie sous la direction de Jean Robiquet, Paris, Éd. nationales, 1934

History 
1925: Le musée Carnavalet, [guide du visiteur], 1 vol, in-12°, Paris, 78 p.
1927: Les Vieux hôtels du Marais et du quartier Saint-Paul, Collection de la Société des promenades, lecturess "Pour connaître Paris", Paris, Hachette
1938: La femme dans la peinture française, XV-XXe siècle, preface by Henri de Régnier, Paris, Éditions nationales
1938: Saint-Lazarre, les vieux hôpitaux français, Lyon, laboratoires Ciba
1939: La vie quotidienne au temps de la Révolution, Corbeil, impr. Crété, Paris, Hachette, reprints in 1944, 1950, 1958, 1960, 1964
1943: La vie quotidienne au temps de Napoléon, Paris, Hachette, reprints in 1942, 1943, 1944, 1946, 1959, 1963 ; édition Famot, Genève, 1976
1948: La vie quotidienne en France, au temps de la Révolution, Paris, Hachette
1948: L'impressionnisme vécu, [histoire de l'art], Paris, R. Julliard

Theatre 
1898: Couplets et rondeaux chantés, in Paris complote, revue in 1 act and 1 prologue by Édouard-Paul Lafargue and Jean Robiquet, Théâtre des Capucines, Paris, Imprimerie des arts et des lettres
1899:  Balancez vos dames, comédie en vaudeville in 1 act in prose, from a tale by Jean de La Fontaine, with Édouard-Paul Lafargue, in-18, Paris, Librairie théâtrale, 44 p.
1900: Les Troqueurs, proverbe facétieux in 1 act and in prose, from a tale by Jean de La Fontaine, Paris, P. Ollendorff,
1902: Le Paradis perdu, fantaisie in 3 tableaux, including 1 prologue, Paris, G. Ondet
1913: L'Épouvantail, by Jean Roby and Paul Cazères, one acte in prose, Paris, C. Joubert,
1922: Contes et propos. Soit dit entre nous, by Jean Roby, illustration by Louis Morin, In-8°, Paris, Éditions La Force française,  119 p.

Biography 
 Qui êtes-vous ?, annuaire des contemporains, Paris, Rufy, 1924
 Who's Who in France, 1959-1960, Paris, Lafitte, 1960
 Henri Temerson, Biographies des principales personnalités françaises décédées au cours de l'année 1960, Paris chez l'auteur, 1961

External links 
 Jean robiquet on   
  Notice documentaire IdRef de Jean Robiquet (1874-1960)
 Pierre Marie Jean Robiquet , notice biographique sur cths.fr 

20th-century French historians
French art historians
French art critics
French curators
French opera librettists
20th-century French dramatists and playwrights
1874 births
People from Meudon
1960 deaths